"Delicious" is a 1994 song by English Britpop band Sleeper, written by the band's vocalist and guitarist Louise Wener along with band guitarist Jon Stewart, and produced by Ian Broudie of the Lightning Seeds.

Released in May 1994, "Delicious" was later announced as the #20 song in John Peel's Festive Fifty and the following year would go on to feature on Smart, the band's debut album. B-side "Lady Love Your Countryside" would also be re-recorded for inclusion on Smart. In 1995, "Delicious" was released commercially in Europe and sent to alternative radio in the United States.

Release
In the United Kingdom, "Delicious" was released by Indolent in May 1994. The single made the band's first impression on the UK singles chart by debuting at #75. In 1995, BMG distributed the "Delicious" single across Europe in maxi and single configurations. Radio airplay promos were augmented with acoustic versions of "Delicious" and "Little Annie", recorded for P4 Danmarks Radio.

In the United States, Arista Records chose "Delicious" as the lead single from Smart at the end of February 1995. The band had been personally endorsed by label president Clive Davis, who had attended a secret Sleeper gig in London at the end of January (under the alias of "The Inbetweeners") to mark the chart success of their single "Inbetweener", and had scheduled the band to come over for live and promotional work across the US and Canada throughout April and May. "Delicious" was sent to alternative radio stations at this time; while a new music video for the American market was considered. "Most people want us to do very literal videos for that song," Andy Maclure explained, "and so far we've resisted.".

Track listings
 
 
UK 12" single Indolent SLEEP 003T
UK CD single Indolent SLEEP 003CD
EU CD maxi BMG 74321 22661-2

"Delicious" – 3:02
"Lady Love Your Countryside" – 2:40
"Bedside Manners" – 2:55
"Tatty"– 3:57

EU CD promo BMG DOLE 11

"Delicious" – 3:02
"Delicious (acoustic)" – 3:02
"Little Annie (acoustic)" – 3:06

EU CD single BMG 74321 22662-2

"Delicious" – 3:02
"Lady Love Your Countryside" – 2:40

UK 7" single Indolent SLEEP 003

"Delicious" – 3:02
"Lady Love Your Countryside" – 2:40
"Bedside Manners" – 2:55

All tracks written by Louise Wener and Jon Stewart, except "Lady Love Your Countryside", written by Wener. "Lady Love Your Countryside" was later re-recorded for the debut album Smart.

Comprehensive Charts

References

External links
"Delicious" music video
Sleeper @ BBC Music
Sleeper release discography @ We Heart Music

1994 singles
Sleeper (band) songs
Songs written by Louise Wener
Song recordings produced by Ian Broudie
1994 songs